Michael Glenn may refer to:

 Michael Glenn (cricketer) (born 1956), English cricketer
 Mike Glenn (born 1955), American basketball player

See also
 Michael Glenn Williams (born 1957), American composer, pianist, and technologist